Angie Thomas (born September 20, 1988) is an American young adult author, best known for writing The Hate U Give (2017). Her second young adult novel, On the Come Up, was released on February 25, 2019.

Early life 
Angie Thomas was born on September 20, 1988, in Jackson, Mississippi where she was raised.

Thomas was subjected to multiple instances of gun violence at a young age. She grew up near the home of assassinated civil rights activist Medgar Evers, stating that her mother heard the gunshot that killed him. When she was six years old, Thomas witnessed a shootout.

In an interview with The Guardian, she recounted how her mother took her to the library the following day to show her that "there was more to the world than what [Thomas] saw that day". This inspired her to take up writing.

In her adolescence, Thomas shared her skills as a rapper, although her career in music was short-lived. She was, however, the subject of an article in Right On! magazine. Thomas went on to obtain a Bachelor of Fine Arts from Belhaven University. She was the first black teenager to graduate from her creative writing course.

Career 
Thomas' initial intention was to write fantasy and middle grade novels; however, she was worried that her stories would not matter.  While querying her first manuscript, she began another that would soon turn out to be her first novel, The Hate U Give. While she was a college student, one of her professors suggested that her experiences were unique and that her writing could give a voice to those who had been silenced and whose stories had not been told. During this time, Thomas also heard about the shooting of Oscar Grant on the news. This story, compounded by the deaths of Trayvon Martin, Tamir Rice, Michael Brown, and Sandra Bland, was a major influence on the novel.

Thomas cites Tupac Shakur as inspiration for her writing. She has felt a wide range of emotions when listening to his music, and wanted to achieve a similar effect as a writer, saying, "I want to make you think at times; I want to make you laugh at times; I want to make you cry at times – so he was an influence in that way." She has explained that the title The Hate U Give was inspired by Tupac's THUG LIFE tattoo, which was supposedly an acronym for "The Hate U Give Little Infants Fucks Everybody." Thomas understands that to mean, "that what society feeds into youth has a way of coming back and affecting us all."

In an interview with The Daily Telegraph, Thomas stated that she aims to "show truth and tear down stereotypes" in her writing, and further says that it is important for the white community to listen to the grievances of the Black Lives Matter movement. After its publication, The Hate U Give was adapted into a 2018 film of the same name by Fox 2000, starring Amandla Stenberg.

Activism 
In an interview with Publishers Weekly, Thomas gives insight on her role as an activist: "I've always seen writing as a form of activism. If nothing else, books give us a glimpse into lives that we may not have known about before; they can promote empathy. There is the movement Black Lives Matter and the organization Black Lives Matter, and I respect what both are doing. I know [The Hate U Give] is an 'issue' book, but I didn't necessarily want it to be that way... I wanted to make something that is so political seem personal. While I wanted Khalil to represent these young men who lose their lives and are quickly labeled thugs, I wanted [the plot of the book] to be its own thing. I didn't want to disrespect anyone's family, anyone's memory."

Works

The Hate U Give (2017) 

The Hate U Give, originally written as a short story, debuted at number one on the New York Times Best Seller list for young adult hardcover books within the first week of its release in 2017. The Hate U Give was written, as Thomas says, to bring light to the controversial issue of police brutality and the Black Lives Matter movement. The book's plot follows a teenage girl, Starr Carter, and how her life is impacted by the death of her friend, Khalil, an unarmed black teen shot by a white police officer. The Hate U Give deals with the effect of police brutality on the communities of those around the victim.

In 2018, the Katy Independent School District in Katy, Texas, removed the book from its shelves after complaints over profanity, and a South Carolina police union requested the book's removal from a school's summer reading list, because of what the union considered "almost an indoctrination of distrust of police."

On the Come Up (2019) 

Thomas' second book On the Come Up was released in February 2019. Thomas wrote the book so she could discuss the costs tolled on minorities and women when they do speak-up. The book tells the story of a teen rapper who becomes a viral sensation and the way that this distorts and changes who she is. It takes place in the same fictional universe as The Hate U Give.

The book was a New York Times bestseller.

Concrete Rose (2021) 

Concrete Rose is a prequel to The Hate U Give and was released on January 12, 2021, in the US and the UK. The book tells the story of Starr's father Maverick Carter.

Blackout (2021) 
Thomas wrote a young adult novel Blackout, released in June 2021, which she co-authored with Dhonielle Clayton, Tiffany D. Jackson, Nic Stone, Ashley Woodfolk, and Nicola Yoon. The book follows six interlinked stories about Black teen love during a power outage in New York City.

Selected awards and honors

References
 

1988 births
Living people
21st-century American novelists
21st-century American women writers
African-American novelists
American young adult novelists
American women novelists
Belhaven University alumni
Novelists from Mississippi
Writers from Jackson, Mississippi
21st-century African-American women
20th-century African-American people
20th-century American women
African-American women writers
The William C. Morris YA Debut Award winners